Chasanova is the second solo studio album by the English singer and multi-instrumentalist Chaz Jankel. It was originally released in 1981, on the label A&M. The album was also released under the title Questionnaire.

The album was recorded over a period of seven months between January and July 1981, in sessions that took place at Eastcote Products Recording Studios, in London. The album featured major lyrical contributions from Ian Dury and musical contributions from two of the Blockheads, bass player Norman Watt-Roy and drummer Charlie Charles and also contained the US dance hit "Glad to Know You", which was one of the tracks with lyrics written by Dury, plus the MTV music video of its title track.

Track listing

Personnel
Credits are adapted from the album's liner notes.

"109"
Chaz Jankel – lead vocals; piano; Wurlitzer; claptrap; Hammond organ; guitar; Oberheim OB-X; clavinet
Norman Watt-Roy – bass guitar
Peter Van Hooke – Linn LM-1 programming
Laura Weymouth – backing vocals
"Johnny Funk"
Chaz Jankel – lead vocals; guitars; Oberheim OB-X; Hammond organ; percussion; simulated car crash
Peter Van Hooke – Linn LM-1 programming; tom-toms; gourd shaker
Chris Warwick – Oberheim programming micro composer 
Steve Prestage – simulated car crash
Philip Bagenal – simulated car crash
Ingrid Mansfield Allman – backing vocals
"Now You're Dancing"
Chaz Jankel – lead vocals; guitars; piano; Hammond organ; Oberheim OB-X; tom-toms; sound effects other than bells 
Norman Watt-Roy – bass guitar
Peter Van Hooke – Linn LM-1 programming
Chris Warwick – Oberheim programming
Philip Bagenal – bells
Tessa Webb – backing vocals
Pepe Lemer – backing vocals
Jo Collins – backing vocals
Mick Leeson – backing vocals
Pete Vale – backing vocals
Alan Carvell – backing vocals
"Magic of Music"
Chaz Jankel – lead vocals; Oberheim OB-X; percussion
Mick Jacques – guitar
Cecil Roy-Doeman – drums
Kuma Harada – bass guitar
Rico Rodriguez – trombone
Dick Cuthell – trumpet
Groko – percussion
Janie Romer – backing vocals
Laura Weymouth – backing vocals

"Glad to Know You"
Chaz Jankel – lead vocals; piano; Hammond organ; Oberheim OB-X; bass guitar
Peter Van Hooke – Linn LM-1 programming; Simmons SDS-V
Mickey Feat – bass guitar
Tessa Webb – backing vocals
Pepe Lemer – backing vocals
Jo Collins – backing vocals
Ingrid Mansfield Allman – backing vocals
"Boy" 
Chaz Jankel – lead vocals; electric piano; piano; Hammond organ; guitar; claptrap
Charlie Charles – drums
Norman Watt-Roy – bass guitar
"Questionnaire"
Chaz Jankel – lead vocals; piano; electric piano
Charlie Charles – drums; bongos; timbales solo
Norman Watt-Roy – bass guitar
Bill Skeat – tenor saxophone
Bob Sydor – alto saxophone
Malcolm Griffith – trombone
Henry Lowther – trumpet 
Alan Downie – trumpet
Martin Drover – trumpet
Peter Van Hooke – agogô
Juan Carnache – maracas
John Altman – horn arrangement 
Tessa Webb – chorus vocals 
Jo Collins – chorus vocals
Pepe Lemer – chorus vocals
Janie Romer – backing vocals
Laura Weymouth – backing vocals
"3,000,000 Synths" 
Chaz Jankel – Rhodes piano; Oberheim OB-X
Chris Warwick – Oberheim programming 
Peter Van Hooke – Linn LM-1 programming
Philip Bagenal – vocal; dubbing

Production team
Philip Bagenal – producer; recording; mixing
Chaz Jankel – producer; mixing
Peter Van Hooke – producer; mixing
Steve Prestage – mixing

References

External links

1981 albums
A&M Records albums
Chaz Jankel albums